Villach Hauptbahnhof (translated as Villach Central Station) is the main railway station in Villach, the second largest city in the Austrian state of Carinthia. It primarily serves as a passenger station and is an important junction within the Austrian Federal Railways (ÖBB) network.

Operational usage

The station has twelve tracks, four of them sidings, and a motorail terminal. It is linked with both to the Southern Railway line to Vienna and the Tauern Railway line towards Salzburg.

Villach is served by Austrian Railjet, InterCity and Regional-Express trains, as well as by the Carinthian S-Bahn rapid transit system. The station also hosts international EuroCity and EuroNight trains leading to destinations like Munich, Ljubljana and Zagreb, or to Venezia Santa Lucia via Tarvisio Boscoverde and Udine.

Train services
The station is served by the following services:
RailJet services (Lienz -) Villach - Klagenfurt - Vienna
Railjet services Vienna - Klagenfurt - Villach - Udine - Venice
EuroCity services Klagenfurt - Villach - Salzburg - Munich (-Dortmund/Frankfurt)
EuroCity services Villach - Ljubljana - Zagreb
EuroNight services (Belgrade-) Zagreb - Ljubljana - Villach - Innsbruck - Zurich
EuroNight services Rome - Florence - Bologna (Milan - Verona) - Venice - Villach - Klagenfurt - Vienna
EuroNight services Zagreb - Ljubljana - Villach - Salzburg - Munich

References

External links 

This article is currently being translated from the German language version. Further paragraphs will be published soon.

Railway stations in Carinthia (state)
Villach